Dorsetodon is an extinct genus of mammal from the Early Cretaceous (Berriasian) Purbeck Group of Britain. It is represented by isolated lower molars.

See also 

 Prehistoric mammal
 List of prehistoric mammals

References 

Dryolestida
Berriasian genera
Prehistoric mammal genera
Early Cretaceous mammals of Europe
Fossil taxa described in 1998